Bishop Isaias Papadopoulos (24 February 1855, Pyrgos, Greece – 19 January 1932) was the first Exarch of the Greek Byzantine Catholic Church.

Biography
Born 24 February 1855 in Pyrgos, Papadopoulos was ordained an Orthodox priest in 1882. In 1883, he converted to Greek Catholicism beside a small group of Greek Orthodox in Thrace. In 1907, he had built the church in Thrace and was appointed vicar general for the Greek Catholics within the Apostolic Delegation of Constantinople.

In 1911, he received episcopal consecration and was put in charge of the newly established ordinariate for Greek Byzantine Catholic Church, which later became an exarchate. On 28 June 1911, he was appointed Titular Bishop of Gratianopolis and was ordained bishop on 21 January 1912. In 1928, he was named Assessor of the Congregation for the Oriental Churches by Pope Pius XI. Papadopoulos died on 19 January 1932, aged 76.

See also
 Greek Catholic Apostolic Exarchate of Istanbul

References

Sources
 

Greek Eastern Catholic bishops
People from Pyrgos, Elis
Converts to Eastern Catholicism from Eastern Orthodoxy
Former Greek Orthodox Christians
Greek Eastern Catholics
1855 births
1932 deaths
Place of death missing